Haider Al-Amer (born December 2, 1989) is a Saudi football player who plays as a full back.

References

1989 births
Living people
Saudi Arabian footballers
Al-Ahli Saudi FC players
Hajer FC players
Al-Adalah FC players
Al Omran Club players
Saudi First Division League players
Saudi Professional League players
Saudi Second Division players
Saudi Fourth Division players
Association football fullbacks
Saudi Arabian Shia Muslims